A modal haplotype is an ancestral haplotype derived from the DNA test results of a specific group of people, using genetic genealogy.

The two most commonly discussed modal haplotypes are the Atlantic Modal Haplotype (the most common haplotype in parts of Europe, associated with Haplogroup R1b) and the Cohen Modal Haplotype (the haplotype associated with the Jewish Cohanim tradition).  However, a specific modal haplotype may be determined for any genealogical DNA test-based surname project or other test group.

List of modal haplotypes

References

See also
Genealogical DNA test
Genetic genealogy

Genetic genealogy